Carla Nolpa (born 10 March 1946) is a former archer who represented West Germany at the 1972 Summer Olympic Games.

She died on 29 June 2021 in Recklinghausen

Life 

She was born in Stod.

Nolpa scored 2165 points and finished 35th in the women's individual event.

She married Udo and was one of the early members of the 1. Bogen-Sport-Club Recklinghausen.

References

External links 

 Profile on worldarchery.org

1946 births
Living people
West German female archers
Olympic archers of West Germany
Archers at the 1972 Summer Olympics